Maksimir is one of the districts of Zagreb, Croatia, population 48,902 (2011 census). Maksimir stadium and Maksimir Park are located in it. It was named for Bishop Maksimilijan Vrhovac.

The urban center of the Maksimir district is located around the Maksimirska street, which is an area of dense commercial and residential usage. It spans from the Kvaternik Square, located on the southwestern border of the district, to the intersection of Maksimirska, Bukovačka and Svetice streets, which leads to the entrances to both the Maksimir park and the Maksimir stadium. The southeastern part of the district is a lowland that includes the Maksimir stadium and a large residential area best known as Ravnice (lit. "plains").

A substantial area in the east of the district is part of the Maksimir Park, one of the biggest parks in Zagreb. It also contains the Zagreb Zoo, which is the second-largest in Croatia; and five lakes, called the Maksimir lakes.

The central part of the district is mostly residential, with the notable exception of the large campus of the University Hospital Centre Zagreb.

The northern parts of the district are hilly, residential areas, with no high-rise buildings.

The district is bordered by Gornji Grad - Medveščak to the east, Donji grad to the southeast, Pešćenica to the south, Dubrava to the west, and Podsljeme to the north.

List of neighborhoods in Maksimir

Maksimir is subdivided into 11 sections:

 Bukovac
 "Dinko Šimunović"
 Dobri dol
 Dotrščina
 "Eugen Kvaternik"
 Kozjak
 Maksimir
 Maksimirska naselja
 Mašićeva
 Remete
 Laščinska cesta
 Ružmarinka

References

External links

 City of Zagreb - District of Maksimir 

Districts of Zagreb